Andrey Andreyevich Rublev (born 20 October 1997) is a Russian professional tennis player. He has been ranked as high as world No. 5 in singles by the Association of Tennis Professionals (ATP), which he first achieved in September 2021. Rublev has won 12 ATP Tour singles titles. He has a career-high doubles ranking of No. 53, achieved on 15 August 2022. He has won three doubles titles and is an Olympic gold medalist, winning the mixed doubles title at the 2020 Summer Olympics with Anastasia Pavlyuchenkova.

In his junior career, Rublev won the 2014 French Open singles title, defeating Jaume Munar in the final. He won the bronze medal in singles and the silver in doubles at the 2014 Summer Youth Olympics in Nanjing.Rublev broke into the top 10 of the ATP Tour in October 2020. He has reached the quarterfinals of the Australian, French and US Opens, and was part of the successful Russian Davis Cup team in 2021. He won his first doubles title at the 2015 Kremlin Cup with Dmitry Tursunov, and among his singles titles are home victories in Moscow and St. Petersburg.

Early life
Rublev was born in Moscow to Andrey Rublev Sr., a former professional boxer turned restaurant manager, and Marina Marenko (née Tyurakova), a tennis coach at the Spartak Tennis Club. His mother worked with tennis players such as Anna Kournikova and received the Medal of the Order "For Merit to the Fatherland" in 2009. She is also the mother of Anna Arina Marenko, Rublev's older half-sister and former professional tennis player.

Rublev has Austrian ancestry on his paternal side, through his grandmother Larisa Genrikhovna Rubleva. He often credits his paternal grandparents for raising him as a child for five days a week until he was 15. Rublev denies the claims his mother used to be harsh towards him: "She was definitely not harsh. My parents always did everything for me. They love me very much". His maternal grandfather, Andrey Fyodorovich Tyurakov was a pro-coach in Greco-Roman wrestling, an amateur tennis player and doubles partner of Boris Sobkin, a coach of professional tennis player Mikhail Youzhny and sparring partner of Grand Slam doubles champion Olga Morozova in her prime years.

In 2013, however, Belarusian Sergey Tarasevich became his other coach. Then Tarasevich was replaced by Fernando Vicente from Spain.

Junior career 

Rublev debuted in Luxembourg at age 13, getting his first win in his second competition in Phoenix. In the following years, Rublev could climb the third rounds in singles and in December 2012 he won one of the top junior competitions, the Orange Bowl.

Next, in spring of 2013, Rublev achieved the NWU PUKKE/RVTA Junior ITF 1 cup in Potchefstroom, South Africa. He successfully competed in following tournaments, especially on clay surface, including the Trofeo Bonfiglio in Milan, and became quarter-finalist at the 2014 Australian Open junior singles. At the doubles competition he paired with German Alexander Zverev, reaching the quarter-finals. The first notable win was at the 2014 French Open junior singles, crushing Jaume Munar. There he also reached the semifinals with partner Stefan Kozlov, before being knocked down by Frenchmen and future winners Benjamin Bonzi / Quentin Halys. He became ITF Junior player World No. 1 on 9 June 2014 after winning the 2014 Junior French Open.

Shortly before Wimbledon, Rublev captured the cup at the Nike Junior International Roehampton in Roehampton, Great Britain. In the Wimbledon Championships, Rublev reached the third round before being beaten by 1842nd-ranked Dutch van Rijthoven in three tight sets. In doubles, Rublev and Kozlov lost to Brazilians Orlando Luz and Marcelo Zormann in three sets, attaining his first junior Grand Slam final in doubles.

Rublev took a break before competing at the 2014 Summer Youth Olympics, where he played in all three events as first-seeded. In singles, he lost to Kamil Majchrzak in three sets, but received a bronze medal for beating Jumpei Yamasaki. Partnering with fellow Karen Khachanov in doubles, Rublev reached the finals, where they again lost to Brazilians Luz and Zormann. He and his mixed partner Darya Kasatkina only reached the second round, where they were defeated by silver medalists Ye Qiuyu and Yamazaki.

In April 2015, Rublev finished his junior career by winning the inaugural ITF Junior Masters in Chengdu, China. In the final, the Russian beat Taylor Fritz in three sets.

Professional career

2013–2014: Early career and Davis Cup debut 

Rublev debuted at the Bulgaria F6 Futures, reaching the quarterfinals. He continued his career in Bulgaria, where he again reached the quarterfinals, but became runner-up in doubles. The 15-year-old reached his first ITF Futures final in 2013 in Minsk, Belarus. After an unsuccessful fall, he recorded his first win at the USA F31 Futures in Bradenton, United States.
 
In the 2014 Tour he started in Kazakhstan, reaching a semifinal and a final in the two Futures events in Aktobe, respectively. In the latter he beat Belarusian Yaraslav Shyla for his second win. Rublev reached the final of the Czech F1 Futures in doubles, partnering with Pole Andriej Kapaś, and continued his success in the Russian F3 Futures in Moscow, becoming champion in singles and runner-up in the doubles competition.

2015: ATP debut, First doubles title

In 2015, Rublev entered his first ATP tournament in Delray Beach, where he reached the second round losing to Steve Johnson in straight sets.

Rublev made his debut at the Davis Cup, where in the second round play-off of the Europe Zone Group I, in the third rubber, he partnered with Konstantin Kravchuk and won the match against the Portuguese team Gastão Elias / João Sousa in three sets.

The Russian participated at his first Masters 1000 entry in Miami, where he defeated Pablo Carreño Busta, but lost to John Isner. He entered the clay season at the Barcelona Open, where as a qualifier he reached the second round after overcoming Fernando Verdasco.

With his win over Finn Jarkko Nieminen at Geneva Open, 17-year-old Rublev repeated Nadal's success in winning at least once on five ATP tournaments in one season as a teenager who is under 18 years old. (Nadal did that in 2004.)

Rublev was called for the Davis Cup team in the 2015 Davis Cup Europea/Africa Zone Group I match against Spain, held in Vladivostok. After losing his first match against Tommy Robredo, Rublev won his second match against Pablo Andújar in the decisive fifth rubber to complete a 0–2 comeback for Russia against five-time champion Spain. This secured team Russia a place in the World Group Play-offs. Russia played in the World Group Play-offs last time in 2012, losing then to Brazil 0–5.

He made his major debut at 2015 US Open as a qualifier. Rublev won his first ATP title at the 2015 Kremlin Cup in doubles, partnering with comeback Dmitry Tursunov.

2016: Challenger title 
Rublev started the 2016 year at the Chennai Open, losing to Stan Wawrinka in the second round. He reached only the first and second rounds of ATP 250 and Challenger tournaments. In March, this poor performance led to his decision to part ways with his coach Sergey Tarasevich. Immediately after that, on 6 March 2016 he made a turn by winning his first Challenger in singles, defeating Paul-Henri Mathieu in Quimper, France. As a result, Rublev jumped 47 positions from 208th to 161st ranking position, a new career-high. In April, he joined 4Slam Academy in Barcelona, run by Galo Blanco.

2017: First ATP title & major quarterfinal, top 50 

Rublev started well in the 2017 ATP World Tour, reaching the second round of the Australian Open after qualifying. On the way he beat 60th-ranked Yen-Hsun Lu, but then lost to Andy Murray. Rublev was successful in some Challenger tournaments. He reached the 2017 Open de Rennes Challenger final, losing there to Belarusian Uladzimir Ignatik. Again in Quimper, France, Rublev now reached the semifinals, losing to Peter Gojowczyk. Rublev also reached the semifinals in Irving, Texas.

The Russian had some success on grass-court tournaments. He got into the quarterfinals of the Halle Open, losing there to his compatriot Karen Khachanov in a tight match. In the next tournament, the Wimbledon Championships, Rublev could reach round two, losing there to Albert Ramos-Vinolas. Despite losing in the qualification round, Rublev as lucky loser reached his first ATP singles final at the Umag Open, beating in the quarterfinals defending champion Fabio Fognini. In the final, he beat Paolo Lorenzi in straight sets to win his first ATP singles title. It was the seventh time that a lucky loser would win a tournament, the last tennis player doing so at that time was Rajeev Ram in 2009 Hall of Fame Tennis Championships. He reached the top 50 at World No. 49 on 24 July 2017.

Rublev went on to compete at the 2017 US Open as a direct entrant. He grabbed his first win against top-10 player, beating No. 9 Grigor Dimitrov in straight sets and made it through to the quarterfinals, beating David Goffin in the fourth round in straight sets. Rublev lost in straight sets to world No. 1 and eventual champion, Rafael Nadal, in the quarterfinals.

He qualified for the Next Generation ATP Finals in Milan and made it into the finals, but lost to Hyeon Chung.

2018: First Masters doubles final 
Rublev commenced the 2018 season in Doha, where he went to the final, eventually losing in straight sets to Gaël Monfils.
Next, he reached the round of 32 of the Australian Open, where he was seeded for the first time in a Grand Slam event at No. 30, but lost to third seed Grigor Dimitrov, in four sets.

Rublev continued his run of good form by reaching back-to-back quarterfinals in Montepellier and Rotterdam, losing to Jo-Wilfried Tsonga and Grigor Dimitrov, respectively. The Russian then had a first round exit in Acapulco, losing to David Ferrer. He did not compete at the 2018 French Open or 2018 Wimbledon due to a back injury he sustained at the Monte Carlo Masters where he lost in the third round to Dominic Thiem after having had a match point.

Later in the season after returning to active play he lost to Frenchman Jeremy Chardy in the first round of the US Open.

2019: Top 10 wins, second ATP title

Rublev opened 2019 by making the round of sixteen in Doha at a tournament in which he had been the runner-up in the previous year. This loss came at the hand of the fifth seeded Nikoloz Basilashvili who defeated Rublev in straight sets in only 61 minutes. Next, in the 2019 Australian Open, Rublev lost in four sets in the first round to American Mackenzie McDonald.

In the Hamburg European Open, Rublev achieved his second win over a top 10 player by defeating the top seed and World No. 4 Dominic Thiem in the quarterfinals. He lost to Georgian 4th seed Nikoloz Basilashvili in the final.

In August, Rublev had the biggest win of his career so far at the Western & Southern Open in Cincinnati, Ohio, where he defeated World No. 3 Roger Federer in the third round in straight sets, handing Federer his fastest loss in some sixteen years. Rublev then went onto to lose to the tournament's eventual winner Daniil Medvedev in the quarterfinals.

At the US Open, the unseeded Rublev defeated eighth seed Stefanos Tsitsipas in four sets in the first round. In the second round, Rublev won the first set against Gilles Simon, but Simon retired early in the second set, sending Rublev into the third round. There he defeated Australian Nick Kyrgios in straight sets, catapulting him to the round of 16 at a Grand Slam tournament for the second time. There, he lost in straight sets to Matteo Berrettini.
 
Later in the 2019 campaign, Rublev lost in the second round to Fabio Fognini, in straight sets, at the China Open in Beijing, after having beaten Grigor Dimitrov in the first round.

On his 22nd birthday, Rublev won his second ATP title at the Kremlin Cup, defeating the Frenchman Adrian Mannarino, in straight sets in the final.

2020: Five ATP titles, World No. 8
Rublev entered the 2020 ATP season by winning back-to-back titles. Not allowed to compete in the newly established ATP Cup, as only a country's top two singles tennis players qualified, Rublev instead entered the Qatar Open, this time winning the trophy as he failed to do so two years ago. Next, Rublev took part in the maiden 2020 Adelaide International. Third-seeded, Rublev overcame Canadian Félix Auger-Aliassime in a three-set marathon match in the semifinal, before reaching the final and soundly defeating qualifier Lloyd Harris. Together with his results at 2019 Davis Cup Finals, this was 12th consecutive win for Rublev. He became the first player to win two ATP tournaments in the first two weeks of the season since 2004, when Dominik Hrbatý won tournaments in Adelaide and Auckland.

Next up for Rublev was the first of the year's four Grand Slam tournaments, the Australian Open where Rublev extended his early 2020 undefeated winning streak to 11 matches by coming from behind for a four-set third round Victory over the 11th seed David Goffin of Belgium. His unbeaten 2020 run then ended the fourth round where he lost in straight sets to the seventh seed Alexander Zverev of Germany, who advanced to his first Australian Open quarterfinal.

Next in the Rotterdam Open, the seventh-seeded Rublev advanced into the quarterfinals with a round of 16 victory over Alexander Bublik of Kazakhstan. However, he then lost in straight sets to Filip Krajinović of Serbia who then advanced to the semifinals.
Then, in February at the Dubai Tennis Championships, Rublev made it to the quarterfinals where he lost in straight sets to the unseeded Dan Evans of Great Britain.

After tournaments that should have started but were cancelled or postponed due to the COVID-19 pandemic, the late 2020 season saw a number of replacement exhibition tournaments. Rublev participated at the Adria Tour, taking place in the Balkans. The tournament was split into four groups of four players each. Rublev, playing in the Alexander Zverev group, in Zadar, Croatia, beat Marin Čilić, Danilo Petrović and Zverev to qualify into the final, where would have competed with Novak Djokovic. However, one of the participants, Grigor Dimitrov, was tested positive for the coronavirus, and so the final match was cancelled.

Later in the season when competition resumed prior to the US Open, Rublev lost in three sets in a two out of three-set-match to British player Dan Evans in the opening round of the Western & Southern Open, which was played this year at the Billie Jean King National Tennis Center in Flushing Meadows, home of the US Open, instead of Mason, Ohio, where it is traditionally being held. Seeded 10th at the US Open, Rublev defeated Jérémy Chardy and Grégoire Barrère, Salvatore Caruso, all in straight sets. Rublev's round of 16 match pitted was a rematch against a player he lost to in the same round in 2019, the fifth seed Matteo Berrettini. This time, Rublev won in four sets and advanced to his second US Open quarterfinal. He then lost in his quarterfinal match to Daniil Medvedev in straight sets with two tiebreakers.

Next, Rublev achieved his third tour title of the year at the Hamburg European Open, where in the final he defeated second seeded Stefanos Tsitsipas in three sets. However, Tsitsipas returned serve by defeating Rublev in straight sets in the quarterfinals of the 2020 French Open. However, this performance guaranteed him a place in the top ten of the ATP rankings on 12 October 2020. Rublev then won his fourth title of the year at the St. Petersburg Open, defeating seventh seed Borna Ćorić, in straight sets. He reached a career-high of World No. 8 on 19 October 2020.

In late October, Rublev achieved his fifth title of 2020 by winning the Vienna Open as the fifth seed. He defeated qualifier Norbert Gombos in straight sets to win his first match of the tournament. Rublev would then beat Jannik Sinner in three sets with Sinner retiring after only three games due to injury. Rublev would then upset second seed and defending champion Dominic Thiem. Rublev would then eliminate Kevin Anderson, Anderson would retire in the second set due to injury. Rublev won his match with Anderson. Rublev would then defeat lucky loser Lorenzo Sonego to win the 2020 Vienna Open singles title. With this win, Rublev qualified for the ATP Finals in London, which was his first ATP Finals appearance.

In mid-November, at the ATP Finals, Rublev was placed in Group London 2020, where he would be eliminated in the round-robin phase. He started off his ATP-Finals debut with a match against Rafael Nadal – the second seed. Nadal beat Rublev. Two days after his loss, Rublev would face off against defending champion and sixth seed, Stefanos Tsitsipas. In his match, Rublev got match point on serve during the deciding set tiebreaker, but he double faulted, and lost the tiebreak and the match. Tsitsipas won. With his loss, Rublev was eliminated from the tournament. Two days later, Rublev faced his final opponent: third seed Dominic Thiem whom Rublev defeated to conclude his ATP Final debut.

2021: Olympic mixed doubles gold, World No. 5
Rublev started his 2021 season with a title at the ATP Cup, a country-based team event. Playing for Russia, in a team with Daniil Medvedev, Aslan Karatsev, and Evgeny Donskoy, Rublev bested Argentina's Guido Pella and Japan's Yoshihito Nishioka in the group stage to help his team advance into the semifinals. There he defeated Germany's Jan-Lennard Struff, coming back from a set down to win. In the final of the ATP Cup, Rublev beat Italy's Fabio Fognini in straight sets.

Rublev advanced to the quarterfinals of the Australian Open after defeating Yannick Hanfmann, Thiago Monteiro, Feliciano López, and Casper Ruud.

Rublev then won the Rotterdam Open, defeating Márton Fucsovics in the final. He also bested top-ten player Tsitsipas en route to the final. With this title, Rublev reached a twenty match winning streak at ATP Tour 500 tournaments, which is the third longest ATP 500 winning streak in tennis history.

The next week, he went on to win doubles at the Qatar Open partnering Aslan Karatsev but lost his first singles match to Roberto Bautista Agut in the semifinal. Rublev's previous rounds were won by walkovers due to his opponents' injuries. The week after, at the 2021 Dubai Tennis Championships he extended his winning streak to twenty one matches with his victory over Emil Ruusuvuori in the second round. With this 21st consecutive win at ATP 500 events, Rublev tied Andy Murray for the second-longest winning streak at the tournament level (since 2009) and also second overall, the only other player to own a longer run of ATP 500 victories being Roger Federer (28). Rublev went on to reach the semifinals defeating Taylor Fritz and Márton Fucsovics in the quarterfinals (for the third time in 2021), losing to wildcard and eventual champion Aslan Karatsev in the semifinals.

In April, seeded fourth, Rublev reached his first semifinal at a Masters 1000 level at the 2021 Miami Open where he was defeated by the eventual champion Hubert Hurkacz.

In Monte Carlo, Rublev reached his first singles Masters 1000 final, defeating 11-time champion Rafael Nadal en route. Although he lost to Tsitsipas in the championship match, he reached a career-high of world No. 7 and overtook Roger Federer in the rankings for the first time in his career.

At the 2021 French Open Rublev was upset in the first round in 5 sets by Jan-Lennard Struff of Germany.

At the 2021 Wimbledon Championships Rublev reached the fourth round for the first time in his career defeating 26th seed Fabio Fognini. This marked the first time three Russian players reached the fourth round at the All England Club since 2006, when Elena Dementieva, Anastasia Myskina and Maria Sharapova made their run. He was finally defeated by Márton Fucsovics whom he beat in 5 consecutive meetings between the two since his win at the 2020 French Open including Fucsovics's withdrawal in Qatar.

At the 2020 Tokyo Olympics, he won the mixed doubles title with Anastasia Pavlyuchenkova defeating compatriots Aslan Karatsev and Elena Vesnina in the final. Rublev was playing mixed doubles for the first time in his professional career and has no plans to continue until the next Olympics.

At the Western & Southern Open, Rublev reached his second Masters 1000 final defeating Marin Cilic, Gael Monfils, Benoit Paire in the quarterfinals and compatriot and top seed Daniil Medvedev in the semifinal, his maiden win over the World No. 2 and the biggest win of his career. In the final, he lost to Alexander Zverev in straight sets. The match, lasting just 59 minutes, was the shortest final contested in the history of the tournament.

At the final Grand Slam event of the year, the 2021 US Open, Rublev was seeded fifth in lieu of the absence of such players as Rafael Nadal and Dominic Thiem. He lost in five sets in the third round to Frances Tiafoe of the United States. As a result of this run, he made his Top 5 debut on 13 September 2021.

At the 2021 San Diego Open, he reached his eighth semifinal of the year, defeating 6th seed Diego Schwartzman.

At the 2021 BNP Paribas Open, he reached the final in doubles partnering Aslan Karatsev where they were defeated by John Peers/Filip Polasek duo. As a result, he reached a new career-high ranking in doubles of No. 59 on 18 October 2021.

2022: Two Major quarterfinals, Four titles, ATP Finals semifinalist

Rublev reached the third round of the 2022 Australian Open where he was defeated by Marin Čilić.

Rublev reached his first final of 2022 at the Open 13 in Marseille, defeating three French players en route Richard Gasquet, Lucas Pouille and ninth seed Benjamin Bonzi with all matches going to three sets. He defeated world No. 9 Felix Auger-Aliassime for his ninth singles title.
At the same tournament he reached the quarterfinals with Ukrainian Denys Molchanov. The duo won against the French pair of Bonzi/Albano Olivetti to reach the semifinals and Hugo Gaston/Holger Rune to reach also the final. He lifted the doubles trophy as well just hours after winning the singles to make it a Marseille double against South African Raven Klaasen and Japanese Ben McLachlan. With the victory, he became just the third player to sweep both the singles and doubles titles in the tournament's 30-year history.

On 26 February, Rublev won the Dubai Duty Free Tennis Championship in Dubai, UAE defeating the Czech player Jiří Veselý in straight set to gain his tenth ATP singles title. Rublev also made international news headlines when, after winning his semifinal match, he wrote "No war please" on a camera lens a few days into the Russian invasion of Ukraine.

Next Rublev defeated 33rd seed Grigor Dimitrov in the quarterfinals at the 2022 BNP Paribas Open at Indian Wells before losing in straight sets in the semifinals to the 20th seed and eventual champion American Taylor Fritz.

In April 2022, Rublev defeated in three sets world No. 1 ranked Novak Djokovic, in the final of 2022 Serbia Open. At Roland Garros, Rublev reached the quarterfinals, where he lost in a fifth set tiebreak to 20th seed Marin Cilic.

On 20 April, the All England Club announced a ban on all Russian and Belarusian players, including Rublev, from competing at the 2022 Wimbledon Championships due to the Russian invasion of Ukraine.

Seeded 9th at the US Open he reached the fourth round, defeating 19th seed Denis Shapovalov in a five set thriller with a fifth set super tiebreak lasting over four hours, for the fourth time at this Major. Next he defeated 7th seed Cameron Norrie in straight sets to reach the quarterfinals, where he was subsequently defeated by Frances Tiafoe.

Rublev won his 4th title of the year at the  Gijón  Open in Spain  defeated Sebastian Korda in straight sets. 

Seeded sixth, the world No. 7 Rublev qualified for his third ATP Finals in a row and reached the semifinals for the first time defeating two former season finale champions world No. 5 Daniil Medvedev and world No. 3 Stefanos Tsitsipas to setup a meeting with world No. 4 Casper Ruud. In the semifinal, he lost in straight sets to Ruud.

2023: Second Australian Open quarterfinal 
Rublev advanced to the quarterfinals of the Australian Open for the second time, where he then lost to eventual champion Novak Djokovic, winning just seven games.

Playing style
Rublev is an offensive baseliner with a big forehand – his favorite shot, and has a dangerous and consistent two-handed backhand. His running forehand is particularly lethal because of his consistency and comfort with the shot, making many passing shots with it. Despite his power, Rublev is often hyper-aggressive and can enter situations where he makes consecutive unforced errors, causing technical and mental difficulty to follow. However, he can also demonstrate periods when his forehand is elusive. He states that he does not prefer a particular tennis surface.

Rublev has a powerful first serve that often reaches 200+ km/h (125+ mph). His second serve, however, is underwhelming because of his high number of double faults during matches, as well as being much slower than his first serve. In 2020, Yevgeny Kafelnikov said the following about Rublev's game: "I think his whole game, it just has some elements of playing junior tennis, hitting the ball harder and harder. If he improves in those two departments, his footwork and second serve, his whole game is going to change."

Endorsements
Rublev has been endorsed by Nike for apparel and shoes, Head for racquets, Italian luxury brand Bulgari for watches, and Penhaligon's for perfume. He used to be endorsed by Wilson for racquets.

Personal life 
Outside tennis, Rublev practices boxing and basketball, and he is particularly interested in Mike Tyson. Rublev also creates his own electronic music like his idols – Martin Garrix and Alan Walker. Rublev is nicknamed the "Rubl'" which means the Russian word 'ruble'. He speaks Russian, English, and Spanish, and also is a longtime fan of the Golden State Warriors (NBA), and has been regularly following soccer matches as a supporter of FC Barcelona.

Rublev is an Orthodox Christian and can be regularly seen crossing himself after matches.

Career statistics

Grand Slam tournament performance timeline

Olympic finals

Mixed Doubles: 1 (1 Gold medal)

ATP Masters 1000

Singles: 2 (2 runner-ups)

Doubles: 3 (3 runner-ups)

Team competitions finals

Records
 These records were attained in the Open Era of tennis.

Awards and honours
International
 ITF Junior World Champion: 2014.
ATP Most Improved Player: 2020.

National
The Russian Cup in the nominations:
Team of the Year – Boys Under-16: 2013;
Junior of the Year: 2014;
Olympians-2020;
Team of the Year: 2019, 2021.
 Sports title "Merited Master of Sports of Russia" (6 August 2021)
 Order of Friendship (11 August 2021)

Notes

References

External links

 
 
 
 
 

1997 births
Living people
Russian male tennis players
Tennis players at the 2014 Summer Youth Olympics
Grand Slam (tennis) champions in boys' singles
French Open junior champions
Tennis players from Moscow
Russian people of Austrian descent
Olympic tennis players of Russia
Tennis players at the 2020 Summer Olympics
Medalists at the 2020 Summer Olympics
Olympic medalists in tennis
Olympic gold medalists for the Russian Olympic Committee athletes
Russian activists against the 2022 Russian invasion of Ukraine